Jordy Hilterman (born 9 June 1996) is a Dutch footballer who plays for Koninklijke HFC in the Tweede Divisie.

Club career
He made his professional debut in the Eerste Divisie for FC Volendam on 14 March 2016 in a game against SC Telstar.

References

External links
 

1996 births
Footballers from Haarlem
Living people
Dutch footballers
HFC EDO players
HFC Haarlem players
FC Volendam players
VV Katwijk players
Koninklijke HFC players
Eerste Divisie players
Tweede Divisie players
Derde Divisie players
Association football forwards